Ahmed Mahmoud Mohamed Abu Kabeer (born 7 May 1990) is a Jordanian professional footballer who plays as an attacking midfielder.

References

External links 
 
 

1990 births
Living people
Jordanian footballers
Jordan international footballers
Al-Wehdat SC players
Mansheyat Bani Hasan players
Al-Hussein SC (Irbid) players
Ma'an SC players
Al-Baqa'a Club players
Jordanian Pro League players
Association football midfielders